Guru Brahma (Kannada: ಗುರು ಬ್ರಹ್ಮ) is a 1992 Indian Kannada film,  directed by  Veerappa Maralavadi and produced by Bhanu. The film stars V. Ravichandran, Sukanya, Lokesh and Sumithra in lead roles. The film had musical score by Hamsalekha. This is one of those rare movies where both hero and heroine played dual roles.

Cast

V. Ravichandran
Sukanya
Lokesh
Sumithra
Ramakrishna
Brahmavar
Ramesh Bhat
Mukhyamantri Chandru
Ashalatha
Jyothi
Mandeep Roy
Shani Mahadevappa
Rathnakar
Agro Chikkanna
B K Shankar
Bharath Bhagavathar
Go Ra Bheema Rao
Nanjundaiah

Soundtrack 
The music was composed and lyrics for the soundtrack penned by Hamsalekha.

References

1992 films
1990s Kannada-language films
Films scored by Hamsalekha